The canton of Semur-en-Auxois is an administrative division of the Côte-d'Or department, eastern France. Its borders were modified at the French canton reorganisation which came into effect in March 2015. Its seat is in Semur-en-Auxois.

It consists of the following communes:
 
Aisy-sous-Thil
Arnay-sous-Vitteaux
Avosnes
Bard-lès-Époisses
Beurizot
Boussey
Brain
Braux
Brianny
Champeau-en-Morvan
Champrenault
Charigny
Charny
Chassey
Chevannay
Clamerey
Corrombles
Corsaint
Courcelles-Frémoy
Courcelles-lès-Semur
Dampierre-en-Montagne
Dompierre-en-Morvan
Époisses
Fontangy
Forléans
Genay
Gissey-le-Vieil
Jeux-lès-Bard
Juillenay
Juilly
Lacour-d'Arcenay
Lantilly
Magny-la-Ville
Marcellois
Marcigny-sous-Thil
Marcilly-et-Dracy
Massingy-lès-Semur
Massingy-lès-Vitteaux
Millery
Missery
Molphey
Montberthault
Montigny-Saint-Barthélemy
Montigny-sur-Armançon
Montlay-en-Auxois
La Motte-Ternant
Nan-sous-Thil
Noidan
Normier
Pont-et-Massène
Posanges
Précy-sous-Thil
La Roche-en-Brenil
Roilly
Rouvray
Saffres
Saint-Andeux
Saint-Didier
Sainte-Colombe-en-Auxois
Saint-Euphrône
Saint-Germain-de-Modéon
Saint-Hélier
Saint-Mesmin
Saint-Thibault
Saulieu
Semur-en-Auxois
Sincey-lès-Rouvray
Souhey
Soussey-sur-Brionne
Thoisy-la-Berchère
Thorey-sous-Charny
Thoste
Torcy-et-Pouligny
Toutry
Uncey-le-Franc
Le Val-Larrey
Velogny
Vesvres
Vic-de-Chassenay
Vic-sous-Thil
Vieux-Château
Villargoix
Villars-et-Villenotte
Villeberny
Villeferry
Villeneuve-sous-Charigny
Villy-en-Auxois
Vitteaux

References

Cantons of Côte-d'Or